Joseph O'Brien Smith (born August 26, 1979) is a former professional Canadian football player in the Canadian Football League. Smith plays the running back position.  In 2007, in only his second season with the team, Smith became the BC Lions' all-time single-season rushing leader (breaking the previous record of 1,510 yards).

College career 
Born in Monroe, Louisiana, Smith's hometown is Cleveland, Texas.

Smith played collegiately as a running back at Louisiana Tech University for 2 years following his transfer from the New Mexico Military Institute.  At Louisiana Tech, Smith rushed for 2,189 yards and added 450 receiving yards to go along with 25 touchdowns. As a senior, Smith was selected to the First-team All-Western Athletic Conference Team and was named his team's offensive Most Valuable Player.

Smith graduated from Louisiana Tech with a bachelor's degree in sociology.

Professional career

NFL career 
Following his graduation from Louisiana Tech, Smith began his professional football career in 2003 as a free agent running back with the Jacksonville Jaguars. However, he was cut after spending 15 weeks on the practice squad.

In 2005, following his release from Jacksonville and a one-week stint with the Tampa Bay Buccaneers, Smith signed with the Tennessee Titans and was allocated to the Rhein Fire of NFL Europa where he became the team's starting running back.

CFL career (BC Lions & Winnipeg Blue Bombers) 
Smith signed as a free agent with the BC Lions in May, 2006, and replaced Antonio Warren as their starting running back when Warren was released in July. In 14 games with the Lions during the 2006 season, Smith rushed 166 times for 887 yards and 9 touchdowns with only 2 fumbles and caught 51 passes for 420 yards and one touchdown.

Smith rushed for 116 yards on 9 carries in the 2006 Grey Cup game, which the Lions won over the Montreal Alouettes by a score of 25-14.

During the 2007 CFL season, Smith broke former Lion great Cory Philpot's single season rushing record of 1,510 yards in an October 28 game against the Hamilton Tiger-Cats.

Smith finished the 2007 season as the CFL's rushing and rushing touchdowns leader (with 1,510 yards and 18 touchdowns, respectively), was named a CFL All-Star for the first time, and won the Western Division's Eddie James Memorial Trophy (as the Western Division's leading rusher).

On September 1, 2008, Smith was traded to the Winnipeg Blue Bombers for fellow RB Charles Roberts.

He was released by Winnipeg on June 25, 2009.

References

External links
Joe Smith's CFL.ca bio
ESPN.com page
NFLPlayers.com page

1979 births
Living people
People from Cleveland, Texas
Sportspeople from Monroe, Louisiana
American players of Canadian football
African-American players of Canadian football
American football running backs
Canadian football running backs
New Mexico Military Institute Broncos football players
Louisiana Tech Bulldogs football players
Jacksonville Jaguars players
Tampa Bay Buccaneers players
Tennessee Titans players
Rhein Fire players
BC Lions players
Winnipeg Blue Bombers players
21st-century African-American sportspeople
20th-century African-American sportspeople